Wasdale Head (traditionally ) is a scattered agricultural hamlet in the Lake District National Park in Cumbria, England.  Wasdale Head claims to be home of the highest mountain (Scafell Pike), deepest lake (Wastwater), smallest church and biggest liar in England.  The last of these claims refers to Will Ritson, who paradoxically proclaimed himself as such. In 1870-72 the township/chapelry had a population of 49.

Topology

It is located at the head of the valley of Wasdale, and is surrounded by some of England's highest mountains: Scafell Pike, Sca Fell, Great Gable, Kirk Fell and Pillar.

Climbing and walking

The hamlet was the centre of the early years of British rock climbing. There is a famous climber's hotel here, the Wasdale Head Inn, made popular in the Victorian period by Walter Parry Haskett Smith , 
Owen Glynne Jones and many other pioneers.

Wasdale Head is a popular starting point for the ascent of Scafell Pike. On summer weekends, crowds of people can be found attempting this steep but straightforward walk. Today, it is the recognised starting point for the ascent of Scafell Pike as part of the National Three Peaks Challenge, a vehicle-supported walk of the highest peaks of England, Scotland and Wales.

Church

In the hamlet is St Olaf's Church, which is claimed as being the smallest church in England.

The church has long been associated with British climbers. The south window has a small pane within it with an etching of Napes Needle on Great Gable, serving as a memorial to members of the Fell & Rock Climbing Club who lost their lives in the First World War.

Will Ritson

Will Ritson (1808–1890)  was a landlord of the Wastwater Hotel (now called the Wasdale Head Inn) in Wasdale, and he told grand fables. One, for example, was about a wounded eagle he found near the inn. He kept it in his chicken coop and nursed it back to health. One night the coop was raided by a bitch hound. The eagle was unscathed, but five months later the dog gave birth to a litter of winged hounds. The World's Biggest Liar competition is held annually in his memory.

See also

Listed buildings in Wasdale

References

 Adam Nicolson and Nick Meers, Panoramas of England, 1997, London: Orion (p. 102)

Further reading
 Hubank, Roger. Hazard's Way Sentinel Rock Press, 2014. . A novel about the early climbing lifestyle at Wasdale Head.

External links

 Will Ritson, biggest liar
The Cumbria Directory - Wasdale Head

Villages in Cumbria
Borough of Copeland